Laxmi Kumari Chaudhary (also Chaudhari) is a Nepali communist politician and a member of the House of Representatives of the federal parliament of Nepal. She was elected under the proportional representation system from CPN UML. She represents CPN (Unified Socialist) in the parliament, and is also a member of the State Affairs Committee.

She was also a member of the second constituent assembly elected in 2013. She was the chairperson of the Committee to Enhance the Capacity of Lawmakers and Resource Mobilisation in the constituent assembly.

References

Living people
Communist Party of Nepal (Unified Socialist) politicians
Place of birth missing (living people)
Nepal Communist Party (NCP) politicians
21st-century Nepalese women politicians
21st-century Nepalese politicians
Nepal MPs 2017–2022
Communist Party of Nepal (Unified Marxist–Leninist) politicians
1984 births